The 1948–49 season was FC Steaua București's 2nd season since its founding in 1947.

For this season, the club's name changed to CSCA București (Clubul Sportiv Central al Armatei – Central Sports Club of the Army).

Divizia A

League table

Results 

Source:

Cupa României

Results

See also

 1948–49 Cupa României
 1948–49 Divizia A

Notes and references

External links
 1948-49 FC Steaua București matches

FC Steaua București seasons
1948–49 in Romanian football
Steaua, București
Steaua